Durbania limbata, the Natal rocksitter, is a butterfly of the family Lycaenidae. It is found in grassland in the KwaZulu-Natal midlands, the north-eastern Free State and south-western Mpumalanga.

The wingspan is 22–27 mm for males and 24–33 mm for females. Adults are on wing from March to April. There is one generation per year.

The larvae feed on cyanobacteria species.

References

Butterflies described in 1887
Poritiinae
Butterflies of Africa
Taxa named by Roland Trimen